Kevin Enkido Yakob (born 10 October 2000) is a Swedish professional footballer who plays as a midfielder for Danish Superliga club AGF.

Early life
Yakob was born in Gothenburg, Sweden to Assyrian parents from Mosul, Iraq.

Club career

Youth career
Yakob spent his early years playing for local side Assyriska BK, a club formed by Assyrian immigrants like his parents, staying there until 2010. At the age of 9 he joined Allsvenskan club IFK Göteborg's academy, staying there for two years. In 2012, Yakob left Göteborg and joined Angered MBIK, where he would spend the next three years.

In 2015, Yakob travelled to England to trial with Sunderland, where he was given a tour of the club's academy and facilities and met with first team players, including Jermain Defoe. He trained with the club's academy teams and watched a Premier League match at the Stadium of Light. A move to north England never materialised however.

In 2016, at the age of 15, Yakob joined BK Häcken's academy.

BK Häcken
During the 2018 pre-season, Yakob was included in BK Häcken's first team squad in the preparations, playing 4 friendly matches.

In May 2018, Yakob signed his first professional contract with BK Häcken, signing a four-year contract, keeping him at the club until 2022.

Yakob made his debut for the Häcken first team on 27 October 2018, two weeks after his 18th birthday, coming on in the 83rd minute against Dalkurd FF, scoring less than a minute after coming on. The game ended as a 5–0 win for Häcken.

IFK Göteborg
In January 2021, he was signed by IFK Göteborg on a two-year professional contract.

AGF Aarhus
In August 2022, Yakob joined Danish Superliga club AGF Aarhus on a 5-year contract, scoring one goal and making three assists against Vatanspor on his debut in the Danish Cup.

International career

Youth
Yakob was first called up to the national team in May 2018, as part of the Under-19 squad that would be competing in a friendly tournament on the island of Gotland. He came on against Hungary to make his debut for the Sweden U19s and scored his first international goal on his second appearance against Turkey.

Yakob was called up for the Under-19 European Championship qualifiers in October 2018, starting all three matches against Scotland, Wales and San Marino, facing Premier League players like Chelsea's Billy Gilmour, Liverpool's Neco Williams and Manchester United's Dylan Levitt.

Senior
In September 2022, Yakob was in the process of getting an Iraqi passport, as he had attracted interest from the IFA to play for the Iraqi national team. On 18 January 2023, FIFA agreed to transfer Yakob’s paperwork to the Iraqi FA and therefore making him eligible for selection for the Iraq national football team.

Personal life
Kevin's family are Assyrians and they moved to Sweden before he was born. He signed a sponsorship deal with Nike in September 2017.

References

External links
 
 

2000 births
Living people
Footballers from Gothenburg
Iraqi footballers
Swedish footballers
Swedish people of Iraqi descent
Swedish people of Assyrian/Syriac descent
Association football midfielders
Allsvenskan players
Ettan Fotboll players
Danish Superliga players
BK Häcken players
Utsiktens BK players
IFK Göteborg players
Aarhus Gymnastikforening players